The Yorkville Branch of the New York Public Library was built in 1902.  It was added to the National Register of Historic Places in 1982.

See also
National Register of Historic Places listings in Manhattan from 59th to 110th Streets
List of New York City Designated Landmarks in Manhattan from 59th to 110th Streets

References

Government buildings on the National Register of Historic Places in Manhattan
Government buildings completed in 1902
Yorkville Branch
Libraries on the National Register of Historic Places in Manhattan
New York City Designated Landmarks in Manhattan
Carnegie libraries in New York City